Sune can be an Afrikaans female name, or an old Nordic male name, derived from an ancient Nordic word for "son".

Origins in Afrikaans
The name is believed to be a hybrid name with origins in the Dutch and local native dialects of South Africa. Its commonly accepted meaning is "Song of God" and is usually given to female children.

Many of the original Afrikaans settlers were devoutly religious and it was not uncommon to give thanks to the creator in word or song. A story is told that a local holy man had a vision in which this name would be given to Sune, a female child who would bring many people back to a deep belief and loving relationship with God.

References

Sune
Scandinavian masculine given names